Dodda Narasiah Ganesh (born 30 June 1973) is a former Indian cricketer who played in 4 Tests and one ODI in 1997. He was a right-arm seam bowler and useful lower-order batsman.

Ganesh failed to make an impression in his limited Test opportunities, picking up just five wickets at an average of 57.40. In first-class cricket, he took 365 wickets from 104 matches, including 299 at 27.09 for his domestic team Karnataka.

Early career
Dodda Ganesh started as a wicket-keeper and an opening batsman. His idols while growing up were K. N. Ananthapadmanabhan, the Kerala wicket-keeper, and India's World Cup-winning wicket-keeper Syed Kirmani. Gundappa Viswanath spotted his bowling talent and enrolled him at the Chikna club. Early days he played in the streets of Balehonnur, where he played with the likes of Ismail. Frustrated with the lack of opportunities, he shifted to AV Jayaprakash's training camp, where he prospered as a bowler and was forced into the Karnataka side.

Domestic career
The 1990s was the golden era for Karnataka cricket. Despite making his debut in the 1994-95 season, Ganesh could not get a permanent slot in the Karnataka team. Due to the presence of Javagal Srinath, Venkatesh Prasad, Anil Kumble and Sunil Joshi. Ganesh had limited opportunities to show his talent. 

In the Irani Trophy in 1996-97, he picked up 11 wickets, including V. V. S. Laxman and Navjot Singh Sidhu, and he stormed into national reckoning. After this performance, he was selected for the Indian cricket team's tour of South Africa.

International career
Ganesh made his international debut in the 2nd Test against South Africa at Cape Town. He bowled 24 overs in the first innings without success. He took his first Test wicket in the second innings when he trapped Gary Kirsten leg before wicket. India suffered a huge defeat in this game. He kept his place for the next Test at Johannesburg. He just bowled nine overs in the game, as South Africa hung on for a draw.

Despite not having a brilliant tour, he was selected for the West Indies tour in 1997. During the 3rd Test at Barbados, he picked up four wickets, including Carl Hooper, in both innings. Despite having only 120 runs to chase, India stumbled in the 2nd innings to be all out for 81. Ganesh played one more rain-affected Test at Guyana.

Later career
Ganesh returned to the Karnataka side and became the team's bowling mainstay. Over a long career from 1994-95 to 2005-06, he took 365 wickets. His best bowling figures were 7 for 36 (12 for 89 in the match) against Haryana in 2002-03. His batting became more valuable over the years. In 2002-03 he scored 536 runs at an average of 41.23, including his only century, 119 against Vidarbha.

After cricket
Dodda Ganesh has expressed an interest in politics and joined Janata Dal (Secular) led by former Prime Minister of India H. D. Deve Gowda.

He took up the position of coach of Goa in 2012-13.

In October 2016, he participated as a contestant on the Bigg Boss Kannada 4, and survived for two weeks.

References

External links
 

1973 births
Indian cricketers
India One Day International cricketers
India Test cricketers
Karnataka cricketers
South Zone cricketers
Living people
Cricketers from Bangalore
Bigg Boss Kannada contestants